Chen Je-cheng (born 23 September 1975 in Taiwan) is a Taiwanese baseball player who also managed for Brother Elephants of the Chinese Professional Baseball League.

During his career, he played as shortstop and third baseman. His elder brother, Chen Je-chang (陳瑞昌), is the coach for the Elephants.

In his early professional year, he played as shortstop. Starting in 2006, he switched to play as third baseman. After the 2009 season, he became manager of Elephants.

Career statistics

See also
 Chinese Professional Baseball League
 Brother Elephants

References

External links
 

1975 births
Living people
Brother Elephants coaches
Brother Elephants managers
Baseball third basemen
Brother Elephants players
People from Chiayi County
Taiwanese baseball players